10th Anniversary Show: Young Wolves Rising was a professional wrestling pay-per-view (PPV) event produced by the Ring of Honor (ROH) promotion, that took place on March 4, 2012 at the Hammerstein Ballroom in New York City. It was the tenth "ROH Anniversary Show" and the first event in the 2012 ROH PPV schedule.

Storylines
10th Anniversary Show: Young Wolves Rising featured professional wrestling matches involving different wrestlers from pre-existing scripted feuds, plots, and storylines that played out on Ring of Honor's (ROH) television programs. Wrestlers portrayed villains or heroes as they followed a series of events that built tension and culminated in a wrestling match or series of matches.

Results

See also
2012 in professional wrestling
List of Ring of Honor pay-per-view events

References

External links

Ring of Honor pay-per-view events
Events in New York City
2012 in New York City
2010s in Manhattan
Midtown Manhattan
10
Professional wrestling in New York City
March 2012 events in the United States
2012 Ring of Honor pay-per-view events